Imam Ali Mosque is a historical and architectural mosque located in the city of Sheki, Azerbaijan.

About mosque 
The mosque was built in Sheki, in the Ganjali quarter. The exact date of the mosques construction has not been preserved. The total area of the mosque is 660 m2. The mosque has a quadrangular shape and consists of 2 floors. There are auxiliary rooms on the ground floor. On the second floor, there is a prayer hall with an area of 26x13 meters.

The mosque was built from burnt bricks. The walls are 75 cm thick. The Imam Ali Mosque has retained its original appearance. However, after the Soviet occupation in Azerbaijan, during the years of repression, the minaret of the Imam Ali Mosque was destroyed and the mosque ceased to function. And only in 1997 the minaret and the altar were rebuilt. The height of the current minaret is 22 meters and, like the mosque itself, it is made of burnt bricks.

Gallery

See also 
 Shaki Khans' Mosque
 Gilahli Mosque in Sheki

References

Mosques in Shaki
Monuments and memorials in Azerbaijan